WEC 49: Varner vs. Shalorus was a mixed martial arts event held by World Extreme Cagefighting that took place on June 20, 2010 at Rexall Place in Edmonton, Alberta, Canada.

Background
WEC 49 was the only event the organization had held outside of the United States. The show was initially announced as taking place at the Stampede Corral in Calgary, Alberta, Canada.  WEC vice-president Peter Dropick, however, confirmed with The StarPhoenix/Canwest News Service that the location was changed on April 10.

Eddie Wineland was scheduled to face Charlie Valencia, but Valencia was forced off the card with an injury. Will Campuzano, who was previously scheduled to face Rafael Rebello on the preliminary card, was announced as Wineland's new opponent.  Rebello would face WEC newcomer Chris Cariaso.

Ed Ratcliff was scheduled to face Chris Horodecki, but just days before the event, Ratcliff pulled out of the event with an undisclosed injury.  Horodecki would face WEC newcomer Danny Downes. The Horodecki/Ratcliff fight was rescheduled for WEC 51, where Horodecki won via split decision.

After WEC ring announcer Joe Martinez resigned to work for Golden Boy Promotions, fellow Zuffa-owned promotion UFC announcer Bruce Buffer agreed to handle fighter introductions for WEC 49.  Kenny Florian would provide color commentary for the event, as he did at WEC 41 alongside play-by-play announcer Todd Harris.

Renan Barão vs. Anthony Leone was originally scheduled to be a bantamweight bout, but changed to a 142lb catchweight bout when Leone (a natural Featherweight) refused to drop to Bantamweight.

The event drew an average of 244,000 viewers, with a peak at 324,000 viewers on Versus.

Results

Bonus Awards
Fighters were awarded $10,000 bonuses.
Fight of the Night:  Mark Hominick vs.  Yves Jabouin
Knockout of the Night:  Eddie Wineland
Submission of the Night:  Josh Grispi

See also
 World Extreme Cagefighting
 List of World Extreme Cagefighting champions
 List of WEC events
 2010 in WEC

External links
Official WEC website

References

World Extreme Cagefighting events
Events in Edmonton
2010 in mixed martial arts
Mixed martial arts in Canada
Sport in Edmonton
2010 in Canadian sports